Tony Ayres (born 16 July 1961) is an Australian showrunner, screenwriter, director in television and feature film. He is most notable for his films Walking on Water and The Home Song Stories, as well his work in television, including working as the showrunner on The Slap and teen adventure series Nowhere Boys.

Early life
On 16 July 1961, Ayres was born in Portuguese Macau (now in China). 
In 1964, Ayres' mother married an Australian sailor and migrated her family to Perth, Western Australia.

In 1972, when Ayres was 11 years old, his mother died by suicide. She was a nightclub singer.

Ayres' stepfather died of a heart attack four years after the death of his wife, and two days before he was due to remarry. Ayres and his older sister briefly lived with their stepfather's former fiancée, before being placed in the care of Ayres' history teacher. They then moved to Canberra, ACT with their guardian, whom Ayres' sister later married. Ayres' 2007 film The Home Song Stories is loosely based on this early period of his life.

Education
Ayres attended Ardross Primary School and Applecross Senior High School, later studying photography and printmaking at the Australian National University in Canberra, before working as an exhibition curator. He later completed postgraduate studies in film and video at the Swinburne Film and Television School (now the University of Melbourne Faculty of VCA and MCM School of Film and Television) in Melbourne, Victoria.

Career
In feature films, Ayres' first feature Walking on Water won the "Teddy Award" at the Berlin International Film Festival in 2002 and won 5 AFI awards. His second feature film, The Home Song Stories, also premiered at the Berlin Film Festival and won 24 Australian and international awards including 8 AFI Awards.

Ayres was the showrunner and director of the eight episode miniseries The Slap, which won five AACTA Awards, including Best Miniseries or TV Movie, and was nominated for a BAFTA and International Emmy. His other credits include producing the comedy series Bogan Pride with Rebel Wilson, and directing the telemovie Saved. Ayres was the showrunner for the ABC3 show Nowhere Boys, as well as executive producer on Old School and Devil's Playground.

Personal life
He is openly gay.

Filmography

Film

Television 
The numbers in directing and writing credits refer to the number of episodes.

Executive producer-only

Producer-only

Awards
Tony Ayres won the award of Best Dramatic Feature at the 2015 Byron Bay International Film Festival for the film Cut Snake.

References

External links
 

1961 births
Living people
Australian film directors
Australian film producers
Australian people of Macanese descent
Macau emigrants to Australia
Chinese emigrants to Australia
Chinese LGBT screenwriters
Chinese gay writers
Australian gay writers
Australian male screenwriters
Australian television producers
Australian television writers
Australian LGBT screenwriters
LGBT film directors
Gay screenwriters
Australian male television writers
People from Perth, Western Australia
People educated at Applecross Senior High School
LGBT television directors
Australian television directors
Showrunners